Canal Road is a street name in various locations, including the following:

Canal Bank Road, Lahore, Punjab, Pakistan
Canal Bank Road, Faisalabad, Punjab, Pakistan.
Canal Road, Bradford West Gwillimbury in Bradford West Gwillimbury, Ontario, Canada
Canal Road (Washington, D.C.), U.S.A.
Canal Road, Hong Kong
Canal Road (Pune)
Canal Road (Jammu District, Jammu & Kashmir), India

Entertainment
Canal Road (TV series), an Australian television drama series on the Nine Network

Politics
Canal Road (constituency), a constituency of Wan Chai District

See also
Canal Street (disambiguation)

Road disambiguation pages